Christopher Louis Salvatore (born May 22, 1985) is an American actor, adult film star, singer-songwriter, model, and gay rights activist, known for his performances as Zack in the Eating Out gay film series. In 2011, he was ranked at #41 on AfterElton's annual list of the top 50 gay and bisexual male celebrities.

Early life
Growing up in the small town of Richboro, Pennsylvania, Salvatore spent his days singing, acting, and performing for his family. By the time he was 15, he had already written his first song.

Career
Salvatore attended the New York Conservatory for Dramatic Arts. He was later cast as Zack in Eating Out 3: All You Can Eat (2009), within a week of moving to Los Angeles. He continued the role in two additional films in the series, Eating Out 4: Drama Camp (2011), and Eating Out 5: The Open Weekend (2012).

Salvatore released a single, "Dirty Love", in 2010.  His later efforts include the singles "What You Do To Me" (2012) and the ballad "Hurricane" (2012). Salvatore's songs have been featured on MTV's Paris Hilton's My New BFF and in the movie credits of Eating Out 3. He has also uploaded short musical covers of songs he and his fans like to his YouTube channel, which in August 2017 had over 36.5K subscribers.

In 2011, Salvatore was ranked at #41 on AfterElton's annual list of the top 50 gay and bisexual male celebrities.

Salvatore appeared as himself in the 2017 Logo TV reality series Fire Island.

Salvatore also promotes equality in the LGBT community, and supports the Gay American Heroes foundation, an anti-bullying charity. Some of his videos include messages for the It Gets Better Project.

In 2017, he raised more than $50,000 to help pay for home care for Norma Cook, whom he first met when he moved into an apartment across the hall from her in L.A. He used GoFundMe to help pay for her, as they became friends and she told him she was diagnosed with leukemia. She later died due to complications from her illness.

Salvatore joined OnlyFans in 2021.

Filmography

Television

Discography

Studio albums

Soundtrack albums

Extended plays

As lead artist

References

External links 
 
 

1985 births
American dance musicians
American male film actors
American male singer-songwriters
American pop pianists
American male pianists
American male pop singers
American gay actors
American gay musicians
Gay models
Gay singers
Gay songwriters
American LGBT rights activists
American LGBT singers
American LGBT songwriters
Living people
Male actors from Pennsylvania
Male models from Pennsylvania
People from Bucks County, Pennsylvania
Singer-songwriters from Pennsylvania
LGBT people from Pennsylvania
21st-century American pianists
21st-century American male singers
20th-century LGBT people
21st-century American LGBT people